The Sene River is a river of Ghana. It flows through Sene District.

References

Rivers of Ghana